Prihradzany is a village and municipality in Revúca District in the Banská Bystrica Region of Slovakia. Before the First World War it belonged to Hungary for 1000 years. Its name is Kisperlász in Hungarian

Sightseeing
In the cemetery stands the old rotunda named St. Anna. It had been built in the 11th-12th century in the Árpád age. Its diameter is 9 meters.

References
 Gervers-Molnár V. (1972): A középkori Magyarország rotundái. (Romanesque Round Churches of Medieval Hungary.) (Mûvészettörténeti Füzetek, 4.) Akadémiai, Budapest

External links
 
 
http://www.statistics.sk/mosmis/eng/run.html
Information homepage of the village Prihradzany (Kisperlász)
Prihradzany (Kisperlász) in Slovakia Map
Prihradzany (Kisperlász) as site for pilgrimage
Barna Gábor stufies in Journal Néprajzi Látóhatár (in Hungarian).
Erdélyi G.: Gömör vármegye klasszicista építészete (Classicist architecture in Gömör County).

Villages and municipalities in Revúca District